Cajabamba may refer to:

Peru:
 Cajabamba, Peru, capital of the Cajabamba District and Cajabamba Province
 Cajabamba District, a district in the Cajabamba Province
 Cajabamba Province, a province in the Cajamarca region

Elsewhere:
 Cajabamba, Colombia, an administrative region in Nariño, Colombia
 Cajabamba, Ecuador,  a town in Chimborazo, Ecuador